Bennie Saradhi was a Malayalam film director. He had directed Manjukalavum Kazhinju, released in 1998. He had also directed the "Abhinethri", "Ashtabandham", "Nilamazha" Malayalam tele series.

Personal life
Bennie Saradhi was born to Ukkru and Lilly, Tholath house at Kizhoor, Kunnamkulam in Thrissur district, Kerala, India. He had married to Annamma (Molly) and he has two children, Vidhu. B. Tholath & Anju Bennie.

Career
Bennie started his career through the film Uppu directed by Pavthran as an associate director. He had also worked with K. R. Mohanan and T. V. Chandran for numerous films including Utharam, Ponthan Mada, Dany, Susanna, Paadam Onnu: Oru Vilapam, Alicinte Anveshanam. He directed a short film Aamam, based on C.V. Sreeraman's short story. and had made a documentary film about Mohammad Sabir Baburaj, a Malayalam music composer. He was the President of "Nanma", an organization for all Malayalam film workers.

Filmography
Manjukalavum Kazhinju (1998)
Paadam Onnu: Oru Vilapam (2003)
Dany (2001)
Susanna (2000)
Ponthan Mada (1994)
Alicinte Anveshanam (1989)
Utharam (1989)
Uppu (1987) (as associate director)

Tele-series
Abhinethri
Ashtabandham
Nilamazha

References

External links
 
 Bennie Saradhi

Malayalam film directors
Film directors from Thrissur
Year of birth missing
2017 deaths